The 1984 Kent State Golden Flashes football team was an American football team that represented Kent State University in the Mid-American Conference (MAC) during the 1984 NCAA Division I-A football season. In their second season under head coach Dick Scesniak, the Golden Flashes compiled a 4–7 record (3–6 against MAC opponents), finished in a tie for eighth place in the MAC, and were outscored by all opponents by a combined total of 199 to 135.

The team's statistical leaders included Derrick Nix with 720 rushing yards, Stu Rayburn with 1,381 passing yards, and Ken Hughes with 621 receiving yards.  Defensive back Derrick Samuels was selected as a first-team All-MAC player.

Schedule

References

Kent State
Kent State Golden Flashes football seasons
Kent State Golden Flashes football